The first USS Tern (SP-871) was a United States Navy patrol vessel in commission from 1917 to 1918.

Tern was built as a private motorboat of the same name in 1907 by Murray and Tregurtha at South Boston, Massachusetts. On 28 May 1917, the U.S. Navy acquired her from her owner, E. F. Nail of Atlantic City, New Jersey, for use as a section patrol boat during World War I. She was commissioned the same day as USS Tern (SP-871).

Assigned to the 4th Naval District, Tern operated on patrol duty for the rest of World War I. She was renamed USS SP-871 in 1918, presumably to avoid confusion with the new minesweeper USS Tern (Minesweeper No. 31), then under construction.

SP-871 was returned to Nail on 21 November 1918.

Notes

References

NavSource Online: Section Patrol Craft Photo Archive SP-871 ex-Tern (SP 871)

Patrol vessels of the United States Navy
World War I patrol vessels of the United States
Ships built in Boston
1907 ships